Panurge (from  / panoûrgos meaning "knave, rogue") is one of the principal characters in Gargantua and Pantagruel, a series of five novels by François Rabelais. Especially important in the third and fourth books, he is an exceedingly crafty knave, libertine, and coward.

In Chapter 9 of the first book, he shows that he can speak many languages (German, Italian, Scottish, Dutch, Spanish, Danish, Hebrew, Greek, Latin and French), including some of the first examples of a constructed language.

In French, reference to Panurge occurs in the phrase , which describes an individual who will blindly follow others regardless of the consequences. This, after a story in which Panurge buys a sheep from the merchant Dindenault and then, as a revenge for being overcharged, throws the sheep into the sea. The rest of the sheep in the herd follow the first over the side of the boat, in spite of the best efforts of the shepherd.

Other uses
 Panurge is also the title of an opera by Jules Massenet, based on the character.
 Panurge is an alternative electronica trio from Vancouver, British Columbia
 "The Advent of Panurge" is a song by Gentle Giant.
 "Le mouton de Panurge" is a song by Georges Brassens (1964).
 Les Moutons de Panurge is a piece by composer Frederic Rzewski (1969).

References

Panurge
Literary characters introduced in the 1530s
Languages attested from the 16th century

de:Panurg